Diabolical Masquerade was a Swedish one-man black metal band with progressive influences. The band was formed in 1993 in Stockholm as side project of Anders Nyström (aka Blakkheim), known for his work as the guitarist of Katatonia.

History
Diabolical Masquerade was a Swedish one-man black metal band. All music is written and played by Katatonia guitarist Anders "Blakkheim" Nyström, who wanted to have a band where he could compose more extreme music while Katatonia was exploring more mellow moods. The music leans heavily on avant-garde melodic black metal with some death metal and thrash metal influences. Blakkheim wanted to experiment more with song structure, theme and composition. This is most notably seen on the last Diabolical Masquerade album, Death's Design. This album is conceived as the soundtrack to a nonexistent Swedish horror movie, with 61 tracks broken up into 20 movements, each with a unique feel and theme. Death's Design includes many passages featuring various genres and styles, experimenting with progressive rock, progressive metal, ambient, classical music, and rhythmic percussion-based passages. Nyström worked together on the album with Dan Swanö. In early September 2004, Nyström announced that he had put the project to rest, after not having found the necessary inspiration while working on a fifth album.

Discography
Promo 1993 (1993) (demo)
Ravendusk in My Heart (1996)
The Phantom Lodge (1997)
Nightwork (1998)
Death's Design (2001)

Band members
Diabolical Masquerade
 Anders "Blakkheim" Nyström – vocals, guitar (1993–2004), bass, keyboards (1993–1998)
 Dan Swanö – keyboards (1996, 1998–2001), drums (1996, 1998), guest vocals (1997), backing vocals (1998), guitar (2001)

Session members
 Sean C. Bates – drums (1997, 2001)
 Ingmar Döhn – bass (1997–2001)

References

External links
 

Swedish black metal musical groups
Avant-garde metal musical groups
Swedish musical groups
Symphonic black metal musical groups
Musical quartets
Musical groups established in 1993
Musical groups disestablished in 2004
1993 establishments in Sweden